The 1929–30 Alabama Crimson Tide men's basketball team represented the University of Alabama in intercollegiate basketball during the 1929–30 season. The team finished the season with a 20–0 record and was retroactively named the national champion by the Premo-Porretta Power Poll. The team was led by Lindy Hood.

References

Alabama Crimson Tide men's basketball seasons
Alabama
NCAA Division I men's basketball tournament championship seasons
Alabama Crimson Tide Men's Basketball Team
Alabama Crimson Tide Men's Basketball Team